The 2005 Texas State Bobcats football team represented Texas State University–San Marcos as a member of the Southland Conference during the 2005 NCAA Division I-AA football season. The Bobcats were led by second-year head coach David Bailiff and played their home games at Bobcat Stadium in San Marcos, Texas. They finished the season with an overall record of 11–3 and a mark of 5–1 in conference play, sharing the SLC title with Nicholls State. Texas State qualified for the NCAA Division I-AA Football Championship defeating Georgia Southern in the first round and Cal Poly in the second round before falling to Northern Iowa in the semifinals.

Schedule

References

Texas State
Texas State Bobcats football seasons
Southland Conference football champion seasons
Texas State Bobcats football